Steven James Lawrence (born 19 May 1976) is a former Australian rules footballer. He is the son of St Kilda star Barry Lawrence.

Brisbane career

Debuting with the Brisbane Bears in 1995, Lawrence was a solid half back flanker who enjoyed a solid career. He came back strongly after two knee reconstructions, where he missed the entire 1996 season (and much of 1997). But he returned midway through 1997 to display incredible toughness in defence.

He was, however, criticised for being a bad influence on some players with his heavy drinking and partying lifestyle. He was criticised by Jason Akermanis on The Footy Show, who later said that it was "no coincidence" that after Lawrence left the club at the end of 2000, the Brisbane Lions won a premiership the next year.

St Kilda career

Lawrence was traded to St Kilda in the 2000 AFL Draft, and was part of some aggressive recruiting by the Saints in that season.

VFL career

Lawrence moved to the VFL, playing with the Williamstown Seagulls. He became their captain and also played in the Victorian VFL State of Origin clash.

In 2006, he was signed by the Port Melbourne Borough as part of a major recruitment drive for the club.

Post-playing career
Lawrence has coached the Caulfield Grammarians Football ClubCaulfield surge late to reach decider. Retrieved 3 March 2012.</ref>

References

External links
 
 

Brisbane Bears players
Brisbane Lions players
1976 births
Living people
St Kilda Football Club players
Williamstown Football Club players
Southport Australian Football Club players
Australian rules footballers from Queensland